Rajya Sabha elections were held on various dates in 2005, to elect members of the Rajya Sabha, Indian Parliament's upper chamber. One member from Goa, three members from Gujarat and 6 members from West Bengal were elected.

Elections
Elections were held to elect members from various states.

Members elected
The following members are elected in the elections held in 2005. They are members for the term 2005-2011 and retire in year 2011, except in case of the resignation or death before the term.
The list is incomplete.

State - Member - Party

Bye-elections
The following bye elections were held in the year 2005.

State - Member - Party

 Bye-elections were held on 30/04/2005 for vacancy from Maharashtra due to resignation of seating member Nirupam on 18/03/2005 with term ending on 02/04/2006 

 Bye-elections were held on 03/06/2005 for vacancy from Jharkhand and Kerala due to elections to JH Assembly of seating member Stephen Marandi on 16 March, 2005 with term ending on 07/07/2010 and resignation of seating member K. Karunakaran  on 19/01/2007 with term ending on 02/04/2010

References

2005 elections in India
2005